Lukas Fröde (born 23 January 1995) is a German professional footballer who plays as a defensive midfielder for  club Hansa Rostock.

Club career

Werder Bremen
Fröde joined Werder Bremen in 2009 from Carl Zeiss Jena. He made his first-team debut for Werder Bremen at the end of 2015–16 season, on 10 May 2015, against Eintracht Frankfurt being introduced in the 90th minute.

His next first-team appearance came on 28 October 2015, in the 81st minute of Werder's 1–0 second-round DFB-Pokal victory over 1. FC Köln.

Würzburger Kickers
On 2 January 2017, Fröde signed for 2. Bundesliga side Würzburger Kickers. Würzburg paid a reported transfer fee of €200,000 for Fröde who had half a year left on his contract at Werder Bremen.

MSV Duisburg
Fröde moved to MSV Duisburg for the 2017–18 season signing a two-year contract with the club newly promoted to the 2. Bundesliga. He signed a contract extension, until 2020, on 13 July 2018.

Karlsruher SC
For the 2019–20 season, he moved to Karlsruher SC.

Hansa Rostock
Fröde was loaned to Hansa Rostock for the 2021–22 season, the transfer was made permanent for the 2022–23 season.

International career
Fröde was a youth international for Germany.

References

External links

Living people
1995 births
German footballers
Germany youth international footballers
Association football midfielders
Bundesliga players
2. Bundesliga players
3. Liga players
SV Werder Bremen players
SV Werder Bremen II players
Würzburger Kickers players
MSV Duisburg players
Karlsruher SC players
FC Hansa Rostock players
Footballers from Hesse